Tae-seong, also spelled Tae-sung or Thae-song, is a Korean masculine given name. Its meaning differs based on the hanja used to write each syllable of the name.  There are 20 hanja with the reading "tae" and 27 hanja with the reading "seong" on the South Korean government's official list of hanja which may be registered for use in given names.

People with this name include:
Cha Tae-sung (born 1934), South Korean footballer
Kim Tae-seong (composer) (born 1978), South Korean film and television score composer 
Jang Tae-sung (born 1980), South Korean actor
Lee Tae-sung (born 1985), South Korean actor
So Tae-song (born 1990), North Korean football forward
Kim Tae-seong (footballer) (born 1998), South Korean football midfielder in the United States

Fictional characters with this name include:
Hong Tae-sung, in 2010 South Korean television series Bad Guy

See also
List of Korean given names

References

Korean masculine given names